Lemuel Shattuck (15 October 1793, Ashby, Massachusetts – 17 January 1859, Boston, Massachusetts) was a Boston politician, historian, bookseller and publisher.

Biography
He taught at Troy and Albany, NY and from 1818 to 1821 at the frontier outpost of Detroit, Michigan Territory at a Lancastrian School.  He was a merchant in Concord, Massachusetts, from 1823 until 1833.  He was elected a member of the American Antiquarian Society in 1831. He was afterward a bookseller and publisher in Boston, a member of the Boston City Council, and for several years a representative in the Massachusetts House of Representatives. In 1844 he was one of the founders of the New England Historic Genealogical Society, and he was its vice president for five years. He was also a member of various similar societies.

When he was 46, he retired from business to devote himself to his other interests.  His research for his 1835 book on Concord history pointed up to him the neglect of vital records.  This was one of his motivations in joining others to found the American Statistical Association in 1839.  He also promoted legislation which required a better system for the registration of vital information.  This law was passed in 1842.  His work on a Boston census in 1845 resulted in him being summoned as a consultant for the 1850 United States Census.  His Report on the Sanitary Condition of Massachusetts in 1850 on a sanitary survey of Massachusetts was later praised as amazingly far-sighted.

His role in designing and implementing the Boston Census of 1845 took him to Washington to help design federal models based on the same. His Report of the Sanitary Commission of Massachusetts in 1850 has been described as a prophetic document in its anticipation of public health developments 

In 1825, he married Clarissa Baxter, and he was survived by three children.

Recognition 

Lemuel Shattuck is remembered at the London School of Hygiene & Tropical Medicine where his name appears on the school's frieze. The names of 23 pioneers of public health and tropical medicine were chosen to be honored when the School was built in 1929.

Lemuel Shattuck Hospital in Boston is named after him.

Shattuck Street in Boston, the street on which Harvard Medical School sits, is also named after Lemuel Shattuck.

Works
 History of Concord, Mass. (Boston, 1835)
 Vital Statistics of Boston (1841)
 The Census of Boston (1845)
 Report on the Sanitary Condition of Massachusetts (1850)
 Memorials of the Descendants of William Shattuck (1855)

Notes

References

1793 births
1859 deaths
People from Concord, Massachusetts
Members of the Massachusetts House of Representatives
Boston City Council members
Businesspeople from Massachusetts
Historians of New England
Members of the American Antiquarian Society
19th-century American politicians
Environmental health practitioners
Historians from Massachusetts
19th-century American businesspeople